Cape Ducato may refer to:

 Lefkada, a Greek island in the Ionian Sea also called Cape Ducato
 Action off Cape Ducato, a World War I naval engagement between French destroyers Mameluk and Lansquenet and French cruiser Châteaurenault, against German submarine SM UC-38
 , a post-Cold-War U.S. Navy RORO transport vessel class
 , a Cape Ducato-class post-Cold-War U.S. Navy auxiliary ship
 SS Cape Ducato, a World War II U.S. Navy Type C1-A small transport vessel; see Type C1 ship

See also

 Ducato (disambiguation)
 Cape (disambiguation)